Gus and Yiayia's is a food cart located in Allegheny Commons Park in Pittsburgh, Pennsylvania. Established in 1934, it is best known for serving ice balls for kids during summer.

History 

This foodstand was originally established in 1917. Gus Kalaris' father then bought the cart in 1934 for $175 ($3,295.30 adjusted for inflation in 2019), and renamed it. 

The name comes from the Greek term "Yiayia" meaning grandmother. The original Yiayia was his mother Pauline, who died in 1992. Gus' wife, Stella Kalaris, became the next Yiayia. After Stella died on October 26, 2016, the "Gus and Yiayia's scholarship" was founded in her name to benefit local kids they served.

Menu 
The stand sells ice balls, peanuts, and popcorn. The ice balls are the main attraction. Originally, the ice blocks came from a manufacturer on Brighton Road, but now the cart imports them in from Ohio.

In popular culture
This restaurant was featured in Rick Sebak's North Side Story (1997) documentary on WQED (TV). 

In 2012, the Pittsburgh City Council proclaimed April 25 "Gus and Yiayia Day." 

Pittsburgh Magazine also named Gus as one of Pittsburgh's best personalities.

Notes 
1.Yiayia is the correct spelling as seen on the food cart. Variations appear across media.

References

1934 establishments in Pennsylvania
Food trucks
Restaurants in Pittsburgh
Restaurants established in 1934
Tourist attractions in Pittsburgh